Emilia Rose Elizabeth Fox (born 31 July 1974) is an English actress and presenter whose film debut was in Roman Polanski's film The Pianist.  Her other films include the Italian–French–British romance-drama film The Soul Keeper (2002), for which she won the Flaiano Film Award for Best Actress; the drama film The Republic of Love (2003); the comedy-drama film Things to Do Before You're 30 (2005); the  black comedy Keeping Mum (2005); the romantic comedy-drama film Cashback (2006); the drama Flashbacks of a Fool (2008); the drama film Ways to Live Forever (2010); the drama-thriller A Thousand Kisses Deep (2011); and the fantasy-horror drama film Dorian Gray (2009).

Fox's television roles include the BBC drama Pride and Prejudice (1995), the PBS British/German television serial Rebecca (1997), ITV Granada's Henry VIII (2003), BBC's Gunpowder, Treason & Plot (2004), the 2005 BBC miniseries The Virgin Queen (2005) and the ITV crime drama series Fallen Angel (2007). She also appeared as Morgause in the BBC's Merlin, beginning in the programme's second series. Fox also starred in Delicious (2016). She stars as Dr. Nikki Alexander on BBC crime drama Silent Witness, having joined the cast in 2004 following the departure of Amanda Burton. Fox is the longest serving cast member since the departures of Tom Ward in 2012 and William Gaminara in 2013.

Early life
Emilia Fox was born in Hammersmith, London. She comes from a thespian family — her mother is actress Joanna David (née Joanna Elizabeth Hacking) and her father is actor Edward Fox. Her uncle is James Fox and her cousins Jack, Laurence and Lydia are also actors. She has a brother, Freddie (also an actor), and a half-sister, Lucy. She was educated at the independent Bryanston School near Blandford Forum, Dorset, where she played the cello, and at St Catherine's College, Oxford, where she read English. Her great-great-grandfather was Samson Fox, a self-made millionaire, and her great-grandmother was the actress Hilda Hanbury, sister of Lily Hanbury. Her grandfather was Robin Fox, a theatrical agent. Through Hanbury, she is related to the Terry family of actors.

Career
Fox first appeared as Georgiana, the sister of Colin Firth's Mr. Darcy, in the 1995 television adaptation of Pride and Prejudice, followed by her role as the second Mrs. de Winter in the 1997 television adaptation of Rebecca, opposite Charles Dance. In 1998 she starred with Ben Miles in the adaptation of Catherine Cookson's The Round Tower as the young Vanessa Radcliffe, a wealthy girl from an affluent family who is forced to leave her home after becoming pregnant. Fox played Jeannie Hurst in the 2000 remake of Randall and Hopkirk.

In 2002 she starred in The Pianist as Dorota, a beautiful, blond, non-Jewish cellist who adores the playing of the Polish-Jewish pianist and composer Władysław Szpilman (played by Adrien Brody). The film was directed by Roman Polanski. In 2003, she played Jane Seymour in a two-part television biographical film about King Henry VIII. She also played the title role in Katherine Howard, directed by Robin Lefevre at the Chichester Festival Theatre in 1998.

In 2004, she joined the cast of the crime drama, Silent Witness. As of 2023, she is still in the show and has now played the role of Nikki Alexander for nineteen years. 2004 also saw her play Lady Margaret in Part 2 of Gunpowder, Treason and Plot, the mini-series about James I (James VI in Scotland) and the Gunpowder Plot. In 2005, Fox appeared in the BBC miniseries The Virgin Queen, a four-part miniseries based upon the life of Queen Elizabeth I, Fox played Amy Dudley, the first wife of Robert Dudley, played by Tom Hardy, despite appearing in only one episode, her character remains a key character in the series. In 2008 she played Sister Jean in Baillie Walsh's Flashbacks of a Fool, which also featured Daniel Craig. She also starred in Things To Do Before You're 30 with Billie Piper, who would later marry her first cousin Laurence Fox, although in 2016 they divorced.

She was cast as Lynne Frederick in the 2004 film The Life and Death of Peter Sellers, which starred Geoffrey Rush in the lead role. A whole section of the film focusing on the Frederick/Sellers relationship was removed in the final edit, although she can be seen briefly in a background shot towards the end of the film. The deleted scenes with Fox can be found among the special features on the DVD release of the film.

in 2007, Fox was reunited with her Rebecca co-star Charles Dance when they starred together in the ITV1 mini-series Fallen Angel, Fox played a serial killer Rosie Byfield, with Dance appearing as her father. The rewind format in which the show was shot traced the development of the killer streak of Fox's character. Fox and Dance had previously both appeared in ITV1's Henry VIII, but Dance's role as the Duke of Buckingham was limited, as his character was arrested for treason less than fifteen minutes into the first half, while Fox's scenes as the doomed third Queen Jane Seymour dominated the first half of the second episode. In the 2008 English language DVD re-release of the cult 2006 Norwegian animated film Free Jimmy, Fox voiced the character of "Bettina". The dialogue was written by Simon Pegg; other actors included Pegg himself and Woody Harrelson. Emilia Fox narrates the popular children's book We're Going on a Bear Hunt (by Michael Rosen and Helen Oxenbury) with Kevin Whately in a special edition book and DVD set. She appeared as Morgause in the second series of BBC's Merlin in 2009. She returned for the third and fourth series. The same year, she portrayed Queen Elizabeth II in the Channel 4 documentary The Queen.

She narrated the Doctor Who character Lady Winters in the Doctor Who Adventure Game, The Gunpowder Plot, (2011). She had previously played Berenice in the Eighth Doctor audio drama Nevermore.

In 2015, she appeared as Julia Swetlove in the BBC's dramatisation of J. K. Rowling's book The Casual Vacancy. The following year, she appeared in series 2 of The Tunnel as Vanessa Hamilton.
In 2016–18 she starred as Sam Vincent in Delicious, a Sky television drama. Silent Witness, in which Fox stars, resumed on BBC1 in January 2018.

In 2019, Fox co-presented the BBC documentary Jack the Ripper – The Case Reopened, alongside criminologist David Wilson. In 2021, Fox and Wilson teamed up to present a full series of documentaries looking at cold cases, titled In the Footsteps of Killers. The second series is due to air January 2023.

Personal life
In 2000, Fox was engaged to the comedian Vic Reeves; she subsequently dated Toby Mott.

In July 2005, she married the British actor Jared Harris, the son of the Irish actor Richard Harris. The couple announced their separation in 2008, and Harris filed for divorce in January 2009. The divorce followed the breakdown of their long-distance relationship and her 2007 miscarriage.

Following her separation from Harris, Fox began a relationship with actor Jeremy Gilley, and in May 2010 it was reported that Fox was pregnant with their child. In November 2010, Fox gave birth to a daughter named Rose. They split up in 2011.

She dated chef Marco Pierre White from 2012 to 2016, and Luc Chaudhary from 2019 to 2020. She is married to TV producer Jonathan Stadlen.

Fox is a patron of the environmental and human rights charity the Environmental Justice Foundation. She is also a patron of the drug, alcohol and gambling addiction charity DrugFam.

Filmography

Film

Television

Theatre

References

External links

 

1974 births
Living people
English agnostics
English film actresses
English stage actresses
English television actresses
English radio actresses
English voice actresses
Audiobook narrators
English Shakespearean actresses
Royal Shakespeare Company members
People educated at Bryanston School
Alumni of St Catherine's College, Oxford
Actresses from London
People educated at Francis Holland School
Robin Fox family
20th-century English actresses
21st-century English actresses
People from Hammersmith
English video game actresses